Arvid Torgeir Lie (18 August 1938 – 19 May 2020) was a Norwegian poet, writer of short stories and translator. He was born in Skafså in Mo, current Tokke municipality. Among his poetry collections are Under fuglens vengjekross (1967) and Snøvinter (1968), and his collection of short stories, Den nye maskina og andre noveller, came in 1986.

He received the Halldis Moren Vesaas Prize in 1995, and the Dobloug Prize in 2007.

Lie died on 19 May 2020.

References

1938 births
2020 deaths
People from Tokke
Nynorsk-language writers
20th-century Norwegian poets
Norwegian male poets
Norwegian translators
Dobloug Prize winners
20th-century Norwegian male writers